In linguistics,   univerbation is the diachronic process of combining a fixed expression of several words into a new single word.

The univerbating process is epitomized in Talmy Givón's aphorism that "today's morphology is yesterday's syntax".

Examples 

Some univerbated examples are always (from all [the] way; the s was added later), onto (from on to), albeit (from all be it), and colloquial gonna (from going to) and finna (from fixin' to).

Although a univerbated product is normally written as a single word, occasionally it remains orthographically disconnected.

Similar phenomena 

It may be contrasted with compounding (composition). Because compound words do not always originate from fixed phrases that already exist, compounding may be termed a "coercive" or "forced" process. Univerbation, on the other hand, is considered a "spontaneous" process.

It differs from agglutination in that agglutination is not limited to the word level.

Crasis (merging of adjacent vowels) is one way in which words are univerbated in some languages.

See also
Grammaticalization
Rebracketing

References

Word coinage